Michael Anthony Diaz (born April 15, 1960) is a former professional baseball player. He played all or part of four seasons in Major League Baseball between 1983 and 1988, for the Chicago Cubs, Pittsburgh Pirates and Chicago White Sox. He also played four seasons in Nippon Professional Baseball (NPB) from 1989 to 1992. After starting his career as a catcher, he split his time about equally between first base and the outfield.

He was traded along with Bill Campbell from the Cubs to the Philadelphia Phillies for Gary Matthews, Bob Dernier and Porfi Altamirano on March 27, 1984.

A fan favorite in Pittsburgh, he earned the nickname "Rambo" due to his prodigious power & Stallone-esque physique. He even appeared on his own "Rambo" poster with the proceeds going to Pittsburgh's Children's Hospital. Following his major league career, he played four seasons in Japan, from 1989 until 1992, for the Lotte Orions (who in 1992 became the Chiba Lotte Marines). He was nicknamed "Rambo-san" there due to a perceived resemblance to Sylvester Stallone. In 1990, he became the first foreign player to catch a game in NPB in 12 years.

References

External links

1960 births
American expatriate baseball players in Japan
Baseball players from California
Chiba Lotte Marines players
Chicago Cubs players
Chicago White Sox players
Geneva Cubs players
Gulf Coast Cubs players
Hawaii Islanders players
Iowa Cubs players
Living people
Lotte Orions players
Major League Baseball first basemen
Major League Baseball outfielders
Midland Cubs players
Nippon Professional Baseball designated hitters
Pittsburgh Pirates players
Portland Beavers players
Quad Cities Cubs players